The 1997 Royal Rumble was the 10th annual Royal Rumble professional wrestling pay-per-view (PPV) event produced by the World Wrestling Federation (WWF, now WWE). It took place on January 19, 1997, from the Alamodome in San Antonio, Texas. As has been customary since 1993, the Royal Rumble match winner received a world championship match at that year's WrestleMania. For the 1997 event, the winner received a match for the WWF Championship at WrestleMania 13.
The main event saw Shawn Michaels defeat Sycho Sid to win the WWF Championship. The main match on the undercard was the 1997 Royal Rumble match, which Stone Cold Steve Austin won after last eliminating Bret Hart. Additionally, Vader defeated The Undertaker, and Hunter Hearst Helmsley defeated Goldust to retain the WWF Intercontinental Championship.

The attendance of 60,477 is the highest recorded live crowd in the Royal Rumble's history with the 2017 edition of the event held at the same venue being the second largest. In addition to hometown hero Shawn Michaels going for the WWF championship, the WWF was working with the Mexico based Lucha Libre AAA World Wide (AAA) promotion, and had several wrestlers from that company participate in the Royal Rumble match, as well as in a number of undercard matches.

Production

Background
The Royal Rumble is an annual gimmick pay-per-view (PPV), produced every January by the World Wrestling Federation (WWF, now WWE) since 1988. It is one of the promotion's original four pay-per-views, along with WrestleMania, SummerSlam, and Survivor Series, which were dubbed the "Big Four", and was considered one of the "Big Five" PPVs, along with King of the Ring. It is named after the Royal Rumble match, a modified battle royal in which the participants enter at timed intervals instead of all beginning in the ring at the same time. The match generally features 30 wrestlers and the winner traditionally earns a world championship match at that year's WrestleMania. For 1997, the winner earned a match for the WWF Championship at WrestleMania 13. The 1997 event was the 10th event in the Royal Rumble chronology and was scheduled to be held on January 19, 1997, from the Alamodome in San Antonio, Texas.

Storylines 
The card consisted of six matches. The matches resulted from scripted storylines, where wrestlers portrayed heroes, villains, or less distinguishable characters to build tension and culminated in a wrestling match or series of matches. Results were predetermined by WWF's writers, with storylines produced on their weekly television show, Raw.

The feud between Goldust and Hunter Hearst Helmsley centered around Goldust's manager, Marlena. During the free broadcast prior to In Your House 12, Helmsley attempted to seduce Marlena. Goldust responded by attacking Helmsley during matches in the following weeks. The feud escalated on the December 30, 1996 episode of Monday Night Raw during a match between Goldust and Jerry Lawler. Helmsley came to the ring and tried to carry Marlena away. Marc Mero, who had dropped the WWF Intercontinental Championship to Helmsley, blocked Helmsley's path, but the distraction was enough to cause Goldust to be counted out.

On July 22, 1996, Faarooq Asad made his WWF debut by attacking Ahmed Johnson, the Intercontinental champion. He claimed that he attacked Johnson because Johnson was not "from the streets", as Faarooq claimed to be. Soon after the attack, Johnson was diagnosed with a legitimate kidney problem, so the WWF claimed that Faarooq's attack had hospitalized Johnson. Johnson was unable to compete for several months and was forced to vacate the Intercontinental Championship. When Johnson returned to the WWF, he interfered in several matches involving Faarooq's stable, the Nation of Domination. He attacked them with a two-by-four, which led to an angle in which Johnson was suspended for the attacks. By December, Johnson's injury had recovered sufficiently to allow him to resume wrestling, and a match was scheduled for the next pay-per-view, the Royal Rumble.

Vader and The Undertaker did not have a substantial buildup to their match at Royal Rumble 1997. Vader had joined other heel wrestlers to attack The Undertaker on several occasions, but there was no major storyline behind their match. The Undertaker had been involved in a feud with Paul Bearer that dated back to SummerSlam 1996, when Bearer had turned on The Undertaker. On the January 5, 1997 episode of WWF Superstars, The Undertaker attacked Vader's manager, Jim Cornette, leaving Vader without a manager at the Royal Rumble.

The feud between Sid and Shawn Michaels dated back to 1995, when Michaels had hired Sid as a bodyguard. Sid interfered during the Michaels vs. Diesel main event at WrestleMania XI by distracting the referee, but the plan backfired when the referee was unable to count the pinfall after Michaels superkicked Diesel. On the following night's episode of Monday Night Raw, Michaels told Sid that he would not be needed in the case of a Michaels vs. Diesel rematch. Sid responded by turning on Michaels and powerbombing him three times. This attack led to a feud between Sid and Diesel, but Sid and Michaels were reunited as partners in an elimination match at Survivor Series 1995. During the match, Michaels accidentally kicked Sid in the face, which led to Sid being eliminated. Sid retaliated by powerbombing Michaels again. Once again, the feud was not developed, as Sid left the WWF. Sid returned to the WWF on the July 8, 1996 episode of Monday Night Raw when Michaels introduced him as a partner in a six-man match at In Your House 9. Sid helped Michaels several times in the coming months by saving him from attacks by other wrestlers. At In Your House 11, Sid defeated Vader to win a WWF Championship match against Michaels at Survivor Series 1996. During the match at Survivor Series, Sid attacked Jose Lothario, Michaels' manager, with a television camera. While Michaels was distracted, Sid hit him with the camera and powerbombed him to win the title. A rematch was later booked for Royal Rumble 1997.

Event

The event opened with the Intercontinental Championship match between Goldust and the champion, Hunter Hearst Helmsley. Before the match began, Goldust attacked Helmsley up the aisle, but they then returned to the ring where they continued to brawl back and forth. Later into the match, Helmsley would attempt to hit Goldust with the Intercontinental Championship belt, however, Goldust countered and grabbed the belt and hit Helmsley with it, and as Goldust attempted to pin Helmsley, Mr. Hughes, who was at ringside as a bodyguard for Helmsley, pulled Helmsley out of the ring. Hughes then continued his distraction on Goldust, which led to Helmsley delivering a Pedigree and pinning Goldust for the win, thus Helmsley retained the Intercontinental Championship.

In the next match, Faarooq faced Ahmed Johnson. Johnson won the match by disqualification after members of the Nation of Domination, who were at ringside, interfered on Faarooq's behalf.

The third match was the encounter of The Undertaker and Vader. Undertaker gained control early into the match; however, Vader gained control after Paul Bearer, who was at ringside in Vader's corner, hit Undertaker with an urn. The Undertaker did not retaliate, as Vader hit a Vaderbomb on him, which gained a successful pinfall for the win.

The next match was a six-man tag team match featuring wrestlers from the AAA organization between the team of Héctor Garza, Perro Aguayo, and El Canek against the team of Jerry Estrada, Heavy Metal, and Fuerza Guerrera. A slow-paced match between the two teams, as they exchange control of the match back and forth. Late into the match, the two teams brawled outside of the ring, as Aguayo hit Metal with a diving double foot stomp off the top rope, which gained a successful pinfall, thus Garza, Aguayo and Canek won the match. 

The Royal Rumble match began with Ahmed Johnson and Crush, where the rivalry with Johnson and Faarooq continued, as Johnson eliminated himself after Faarooq came down the aisle to chase him. Stone Cold Steve Austin was the fifth entrant. There were clock issues from numbers 3 to 5 but were fixed for No. 6, Bart Gunn. Stone Cold Steve Austin during the match had two separate runs where he eliminated wrestlers one by one and having the ring to himself for long stretches. Numerous wrestlers from AAA were invited to be entrants in the match. Mil Mascaras eliminated Cibernetico and Pierroth and then eliminated himself by diving onto them at ringside; years later Bruce Prichard stated that this spot had been devised because WWE creative anticipated that Mascaras would refuse to allow himself to be eliminated by anyone else; the Mexican star had long been notorious for refusing to allow other wrestlers to defeat him.  No. 24 was Terry Funk who jumped ahead a little bit before the buzzer went off. The final five wrestlers were The Undertaker, Vader, Bret Hart, Diesel, and Stone Cold Steve Austin. The first of those wrestlers to be tossed over the top rope was Austin, who was thrown out by Hart. However, the officials were occupied trying to separate Terry Funk and Mankind, who were brawling with each other outside the ring, and thus no one saw Austin's elimination. Meanwhile, Vader and Undertaker began brawling with each other as a continuation of their feud and Hart began fighting with Diesel as Austin reentered the ring. Austin dumped both Undertaker and Vader out of the ring, while Hart eliminated Diesel. As Hart was celebrating, thinking he had won, Austin came in from behind and tossed him over the top rope. Since Austin was still considered to be in the match and was the only man left in the ring, the officials declared him the winner.  With ten eliminations, Austin tied Hulk Hogan for the most eliminations in single Royal Rumble match. The record stood until 2001, when Kane eliminated eleven competitors.

The main event was a WWF Championship match between Shawn Michaels and Sycho Sid. Sid dominated most of the match and worked over on Michaels's back early into the match, however Michaels retaliated by hitting a flying elbow drop on Sid. Michaels then attempted to deliver Sweet Chin Music to Sid, however, he countered by tossing Michaels over the top rope onto ringside. As Sid threw Michaels back into the ring, Michaels accidentally hit referee Earl Hebner. Sid then delivered a Chokeslam and attempted to pin him, however, as the first referee was down, a second referee came out to count the pin, which got a two count. Sid then attacked the second referee, which allowed Michaels to hit Sid with a camera and delivered Sweet Chin Music, as the original referee slowly counted the successful pinfall, thus Michaels won the WWF Championship.

Aftermath
Shawn Michaels later vacated the WWF Championship on the Thursday Raw Thursday special, where he gave his now-infamous "lost my smile" promo, citing knee problems as his reason to abdicate the title. Due to this and the controversial situation over the Royal Rumble ending, Stone Cold Steve Austin, Bret Hart, The Undertaker, and Vader were pitted against each other at In Your House 13: Final Four in a Four Corners match for the vacant WWF Championship, which saw Hart win the title. The next night on Raw, Austin interfered in a WWF Title match between Hart and Sid, causing Hart to lose the title after only one day. On the March 17 edition of Raw, Hart and Sid faced off in a Steel Cage match for the WWF Title. Sid won after interference by both Stone Cold and Undertaker. At WrestleMania 13, Undertaker defeated Sid for the WWF Title, while Hart and Austin battled each other in a Submission match with Ken Shamrock as the special referee.

Results

Royal Rumble entrances and eliminations
A new entrant came out approximately every 90 seconds. Early in the Rumble match, Vince McMahon stated on commentary that they had problems with the clock.

 – indicates a wrestler from Lucha Libre AAA World Wide (AAA), who was in a partnership with the WWF at the time. 

 – Winner

Austin was eliminated by Bret Hart, but snuck back in the ring while officials were distracted by a brawl between Terry Funk and Mankind on the other side of the ring.

 Faarooq was eliminated when Ahmed Johnson (who had eliminated himself from the Rumble earlier on) came back into the ring with a 2×4 and went after Faarooq, causing him to go over the top rope.

In this match,Stone Cold Steve Austin tied the record for the most eliminations in a single royal rumble with 10. The previous record holder was Hulk Hogan, who eliminated 10 participants from the Royal Rumble 1989

References

External links
Official website

1997
Events in San Antonio
1997 in Texas
Professional wrestling in San Antonio
1997 WWF pay-per-view events
January 1997 events in the United States